Ron Copeland is an American politician and retired law enforcement officer serving as a member of the Missouri House of Representatives from the 143rd district. Elected in November 2020, he assumed office on January 6, 2021.

Early life and education 
Copeland was born in Jefferson City, Missouri. He studied criminal justice at the University of Central Missouri and Lincoln University.

Career 
Copeland served in the Missouri National Guard for six years and was a trooper in the Missouri State Highway Patrol for 28 years. He was elected to the Missouri House of Representatives in November 2020 and assumed office on January 6, 2021.

References 

Living people
Republican Party members of the Missouri House of Representatives
People from Jefferson City, Missouri
Year of birth missing (living people)